Peter Short (born April 26, 1976, in Richmond, British Columbia) is a  field hockey player from Canada, whose brother Rob also represents the Men's National Team.

A striker, Short played for several years in the Dutch League with HGC and HC Rotterdam.  He left Rotterdam after helping the club promote to the First Division in the spring of 2005.  For the next two years, Short moved to the UK and played hockey for Surbiton Hockey Club in the south London area. During his time in London he studied Urban Planning at the University College London, where he acquired a master's degree in International Planning at the University College London.

In the summer of 2007, Short and his Canadian National team members won gold at the Pan American Games in Brazil and by doing so, qualified for the 2008 Beijing Olympic Games. That fall he moved to Amsterdam and played for Laren Hockey Club in the Netherlands and worked at CB Richard Ellis. The Canadian National Field Hockey Team finished in 10th position at the 2008 Olympic Games. Going into the Olympics Canada was ranked 15th in the world.

He now resides in Kelowna, British Columbia with his family.

International senior competitions
 2001 — World Cup Qualifier, Edinburgh (8th)
 2003 — Pan American Games, Santo Domingo (2nd)
 2004 — Olympic Qualifier, Madrid (11th)
 2004 – Pan Am Cup, London (2nd)
 2006 — Commonwealth Games, Melbourne (9th)
 2007 — Pan American Games, Rio de Janeiro (1st)
 2008 — Olympic Games, Beijing, China (10th)

References
sports-reference

External links
 

1976 births
Living people
Canadian expatriate sportspeople in the Netherlands
Canadian expatriate sportspeople in England
Canadian male field hockey players
Canadian people of English descent
Field hockey players at the 2002 Commonwealth Games
Field hockey players at the 2006 Commonwealth Games
Field hockey players at the 2008 Summer Olympics
Olympic field hockey players of Canada
People from Richmond, British Columbia
Pan American Games competitors for Canada
Alumni of University College London
HGC players
Field hockey people from British Columbia
Surbiton Hockey Club players
HC Rotterdam players
Field hockey players at the 2003 Pan American Games
Field hockey players at the 2007 Pan American Games
Commonwealth Games competitors for Canada
Pan American Games silver medalists for Canada
Medalists at the 2003 Pan American Games
Pan American Games medalists in field hockey